Michael John Scully (born November 1, 1965) is a former American football center in the National Football League for the Washington Redskins.  He played college football at the University of Illinois.  He was selected to play in the 1988 Senior Bowl. Scully was released by the Redkins after a season-opening loss to the New York Giants, in which he bounced two snaps to punter Steve Cox.

He is currently the PGA Director of Golf at Desert Mountain Golf Club in North Scottsdale, AZ and in 2008 was named IPGA Head Professional of the Year.

References

1965 births
Living people
People from Chicago
American football centers
Illinois Fighting Illini football players
Washington Redskins players